Billy Franklin Smith (born January 14, 1930 at High Point, North Carolina) is a retired American professional baseball first baseman, outfielder, manager and coach. Smith compiled a lifetime batting average of .312 in minor league baseball but he never climbed higher than the Double-A level.

Smith graduated from Jamestown, North Carolina, High School and attended North Carolina State University. He played in the Boston/Milwaukee Braves' farm system from 1950–1954 and 1956–1960, spending his last three seasons as the playing manager of the Boise Braves of the Class C Pioneer League. In 1959, he managed Boise to an 81–47 record and a runaway Pioneer League regular-season title, and led the league in hitting with a .390 mark. But his club fell in the first round of the playoffs to the Idaho Falls Russets. (His Boise club would win the playoffs in both 1958 and 1960, however.)

Smith scouted for the Braves from 1961–66, then switched to the Houston Astros' organization as a scout and minor league manager at the Rookie and Short Season-A levels from 1967–79. In 1980, he became director of player development of the  Toronto Blue Jays of the American League, serving in that post for four seasons before returning to uniform as a Blue Jay coach under Bobby Cox and Jimy Williams from 1984–88.

References

External links

Information at Retrosheet

1930 births
Living people
Atlanta Braves scouts
Atlanta Crackers players
Baseball players from North Carolina
Boise Braves players
Evansville Braves players
Hagerstown Braves players
Hartford Chiefs players
High Point-Thomasville Hi-Toms players
Houston Astros scouts
Jacksonville Braves players
Lincoln Chiefs players
Major League Baseball farm directors
Major League Baseball first base coaches
Milwaukee Braves scouts
Minor league baseball managers
NC State Wolfpack baseball players
Sportspeople from High Point, North Carolina
Toronto Blue Jays coaches
Toronto Blue Jays executives